Kelvin Robertson (born 3 January 1983) is an Australian former professional basketball player who played his entire career with the Townsville Crocodiles of the National Basketball League. A local product, he suffered two knee injuries in 2009 that required reconstructions, forcing him into early retirement.

References

External links
Profile at Eurobasket.com
Profile at andthefoul.net

1983 births
Living people
Australian men's basketball players
Sportspeople from Townsville
Point guards
Townsville Crocodiles players